The eighth season of the American comedy television series Scrubs premiered on ABC on January 6, 2009 and concluded on May 6, 2009 and consists of 19 episodes. The eighth season was the first to be shown on ABC after NBC dropped the series, ending its seven-year run on the network. ABC's pick-up of the show was followed by it commissioning nineteen episodes, which included an hour-long finale. For all of the season's run, it was expected that the eighth season would be the last, especially after the show's creator Bill Lawrence announced it. After rumors surfaced of a ninth season, it was understood that the eighth would be the last to star Zach Braff and much of the main cast. However, the show was later re-commissioned for another season, in which Braff and other cast members appeared for multiple episodes. The eighth season was the first to air in high definition.

Needing to cut costs for the eighth season, Bill Lawrence stated that he divided the writing staff up into two groups, half for the first seven episodes and half for the last eleven episodes. Additionally, each main cast member was absent for three episodes during the season (except Zach Braff and Sarah Chalke who are absent for two). An accompanying web series that aired on ABC's website called Scrubs: Interns was also created to coincide with the season, starring the new interns with guest appearances by the main cast.

Cast and characters

Main cast
Another way ABC cut costs is to have the main cast absent in a few episodes. Series star Zach Braff is absent for an episode for the first time in the series, and only lends his voice to another episode.

Zach Braff as Dr. John "J.D." Dorian
Sarah Chalke as Dr. Elliot Reid
Donald Faison as Dr. Chris Turk
Neil Flynn as The Janitor
Ken Jenkins as Dr. Bob Kelso
John C. McGinley as Dr. Perry Cox
Judy Reyes as Nurse Carla Espinosa

Recurring roles
Robert Maschio as Dr. Todd Quinlan
Sam Lloyd as Ted Buckland
Eliza Coupe as Dr. Denise Mahoney
Christa Miller as Jordan Sullivan
Betsy Beutler as Dr. Katie Collins
Sonal Shah as Dr. Sonja "Sunny" Dey
Todd Bosley as Dr. Howard "Howie" Gelder
Kit Pongetti as Ladinia "Lady" Williams
Taran Killam as Jimmy "The Overly Touchy Orderly"
Aziz Ansari as Dr. Ed Dhandapani

Guest stars
Courteney Cox as Dr. Taylor Maddox
Kate Micucci as Stephanie Gooch
Lee Thompson Young as Dr. Derek Hill
Elizabeth Banks as Dr. Kim Briggs
Johnny Kastl as Dr. Doug Murphy
Travis Schuldt as Keith Dudemeister
Aloma Wright as Nurse Laverne Roberts
Scott Foley as Sean Kelly
Jay Kenneth Johnson as Dr. Matthews
The Blanks as the Worthless Peons

Production
After a rumor-induced build-up to season eight, and it being believed that season seven was the last, ABC picked up Scrubs and announced it as a midseason replacement. The first episode aired January 6, 2009.

The season's timeslot shifted from Scrubs being shown on Tuesdays at 9:00 pm and 9:30 pm to Wednesdays at 8:00 pm beginning with episode 11, "My Nah Nah Nah." The show performed most successfully on Wednesdays, with average viewing figures of 5.36 million an episode.

To cut costs the writing staff was split into two groups, with the exception of Bill Lawrence, Neil Goldman and Garrett Donovan, and Bill Callahan: one group for the first seven episodes, and the second for the rest of the season. Since Goldman & Donovan, Callahan and Lawrence wrote an episode in the second half, the term was longer. Mike Schwartz and Mark Stegemann, two writers who had been on since season one, did not return to the writing staff, although Stegemann did return to direct one episode. For the episode "My Nah Nah Nah," writers who didn't work in season 8 were credited, since the episode was partially written/filmed in season 7.

Writing staff
Bill Lawrence – executive producer/head writer
Neil Goldman and Garrett Donovan – executive producers/assistant head writers
Bill Callahan – executive producer/assistant head writer
Episodes 1–7
Janae Bakken – co-executive producer
Angela Nissel – co-executive producer
Aseem Batra – co-producer
Clarence Livingston – co-producer
Dave Tennant – executive story editor
Taii K. Austin – staff writer
Episodes 8–19
Debra Fordham – co-executive producer
Tad Quill – consulting producer
Kevin Biegel – co-producer
Andy Schwartz – executive story editor
Devin Mahoney & Rego Marquiis – staff writers

Production staff
Bill Lawrence – executive producer/showrunner
Randall Winston – producer
Liz Newman – producer
Danny Rose – co-producer
Abraham Park – associate producer

Directors
Includes directors who directed 2 or more episodes, or directors who are part of the cast and crew
Bill Lawrence (6 episodes)
Michael Spiller (2 episodes)
John Putch (2 episodes)
Zach Braff (1 episode)
Michael McDonald (1 episode)
John Michel (editor) (1 episode)
Mark Stegemann (writer) (1 episode)

Scrubs: Interns
To coincide with Scrubs being shown on television, a web series was produced called Scrubs: Interns. It consisted of twelve webisodes following the adventures of the interns at Sacred Heart Hospital. The episodes featured cameos from several regular cast members, and included an episode with J.D. The webisodes' theme tune was performed by The Blanks.

Episodes

References 

General references

External links 

 

 
2009 American television seasons
8